This is the results breakdown of the local elections held in Extremadura on 13 June 1999. The following tables show detailed results in the autonomous community's most populous municipalities, sorted alphabetically.

City control
The following table lists party control in the most populous municipalities, including provincial capitals (shown in bold). Gains for a party are displayed with the cell's background shaded in that party's colour.

Municipalities

Almendralejo
Population: 27,443

Badajoz
Population: 134,710

Cáceres
Population: 78,614

Mérida
Population: 50,471

Plasencia
Population: 36,465

See also
1999 Extremaduran regional election

References

Extremadura
1999